Paraschistura punjabensis is a species of ray-finned fish in the genus Paraschistura.

Footnotes 
 

punjabensis
Taxa named by Sunder Lal Hora
Fish described in 1923